Nazim-e-Quetta is the Mayor who head the Quetta Metropolitan Corporation (QMC) which controls the Local Government system of Quetta, Balochistan.

Quetta local government system 

Quetta Local Government System is headed by Quetta Metropolitan Corporation (QMC). District council Quetta is a separate body which governs the rural areas of Quetta. There are total 84 seats for QMC. The Balochistan Local Government act is very similar to Sindh and Punjab Local Government Act which is based on amended form of Balochistan Local Government Act 2010.

List of mayors of Quetta 
Following is the list of mayors of Quetta.

City district government Quetta 
Pervez Musharraf created city district Government Quetta which functioned 2001 - 2009. The city was divided into two towns which had their respective mayors, Zargoon Town and Chiltan Town.

Mayor election history

Mayor elections 2013

References 

Quetta